Pessac is a railway station in Pessac, a western suburb of Bordeaux, Nouvelle-Aquitaine, France. The station is located on the Bordeaux–Irun railway line. The station is served by TER (local) services operated by SNCF. The Pessac Centre tram stop of the Bordeaux tramway is adjacent to the railway station, with direct access between station and tram stop platforms.

Train services

The following services currently call at Pessac:
local service (TER Nouvelle-Aquitaine) Bordeaux - Arcachon
local service (TER Nouvelle-Aquitaine) Pessac - Macau
local service (TER Nouvelle-Aquitaine) Bordeaux - Morcenx - Mont-de-Marsan
local service (TER Nouvelle-Aquitaine) Bordeaux - Dax - Bayonne - Hendaye
local service (TER Nouvelle-Aquitaine) Bordeaux - Dax - Pau - Tarbes

Connections 
 Bordeaux tramway : Line  : Bassins à Flots - Bordeaux / Pessac Centre station.
 Bus lines of the TBM:

Close by 
 Pessac Centre tram stop
 City hall of Pessac

References

Railway stations in Gironde